Melvin L. Stukes (born March 15, 1948) is an American politician who represented the 44th legislative district in the Maryland House of Delegates. Stukes was a member of the House Ways and Means Committee and the Legislative Black Caucus of Maryland. Prior to winning a seat in the Maryland General Assembly, Stukes served 13 years in the Baltimore City Council.

Background
Delegate Stukes was born in Baltimore, his father was in the Navy and the family moved several times during his childhood.  He graduated from Scott's Branch High school in Summerton, South Carolina. After high school he enlisted in U.S. Air Force, served three years until 1968 and later entered Morgan State University, where he earned a B.S. in business administration in 1975. During his stint on the Baltimore City Council, Stukes made national news by introducing a resolution that would ban the word nigger. Stukes said he was prompted to introduce the measure, not because of racism, but because it was being used widely by members of his own race. Stukes said that by ignoring the use of the word, officials give the impression, especially to young people, that it is acceptable.

Due to redistricting, District 44 was divided into 44A and 44B, which resulted in three incumbent delegates, including Stukes, having to run for the same district seat. Stukes came in third.

Democratic primary election results, 2014 
2014 Race for Maryland House of Delegates – District 44A
Voters to choose one:
{| class="wikitable"
|-
!Name
!Votes
!Percent
!Outcome
|-
|- 
|Keith E. Haynes 
|1734
|  43.4%
|   Won
|-
|- 
| Keiffer J. Mitchell, Jr.
|1574
|  39.4%
|   Lost
|-
|- 
|Melvin L. Stukes
|523
|  17.3%
|   Lost
|-
|-
|-
|}

Democratic primary election results, 2010
2010 Race for Maryland House of Delegates – 44th District
Voters to choose three: (only the top 6 finishers are shown)
{| class="wikitable"
|-
!Name
!Votes
!Percent
!Outcome
|-
|-
|Keith E. Haynes 
|4859
|  25.9%
|   Won
|-
|-
| Keiffer J. Mitchell, Jr.
|4481
|  13.9%
|   Won
|-
|-
|Melvin L. Stukes
|3321
|  17.7%
|   Won
|-
|-
| Ruth M. Kirk
|2860
|  15.2%
|   Lost
|-
|-
| Chris Blake
|973
|  5.1%
|   Lost
|-
|-
|Gary T. English  
|907 
|  4.8%
|   Lost
|-
|}

General election results, 2006
2006 Race for Maryland House of Delegates – 44th District
Voters to choose three:
{| class="wikitable"
|-
!Name
!Votes
!Percent
!Outcome
|-
|-
|Melvin L. Stukes Dem.
|13,173
|  34.0%
|   Won
|-
|-
|Ruth M. Kirk, Dem.
|12,894
|  33.3%
|   Won
|-
|-
|Keith E. Haynes, Dem.
|12,565
|  32.4%
|   Won
|-
|Other Write-Ins 
|129
|  0.3%
|   
|-
|}

Legislative notes
Co-sponsored HB 860 (Baltimore City Public Schools Construction and Revitalization Act of 2013). Signed by the Governor on May 16, 2013, the new law approved 1.1 billion dollars to construct new schools in Baltimore City.
 voted for the Clean Indoor Air Act of 2007 (HB359)
 voted for the Tax Reform Act of 2007(HB2)
 voted in favor of prohibiting ground rents in 2007(SB106)
 sponsored House Bill 30 in 2007, allowing the state to confiscate unused portions of gift certificates after 4 years.

References

Democratic Party members of the Maryland House of Delegates
African-American state legislators in Maryland
1948 births
Living people
Baltimore City Council members
African-American United States Air Force personnel
Morgan State University alumni
21st-century American politicians
African-American city council members in Maryland
21st-century African-American politicians
20th-century African-American people